re-released as  is a side-scrolling action game developed by Taito and released for arcades in 1982. It was originally distributed as Jungle King, then quickly modified and re-released as Jungle Hunt due to a copyright dispute over the player character's likeness to Tarzan. Jungle King, along with Moon Patrol released a month earlier, is one of the first video games with parallax scrolling.

The player controls an unnamed character moving through horizontally scrolling scenes to rescue a woman from cannibals by jumping from vine to vine, swimming a crocodile-infested river, and avoiding rolling rocks. In the original Jungle King release, the loincloth-wearing character resembles Tarzan. In the rebranded Jungle Hunt, the player character is an explorer, sporting a pith helmet and safari suit. Another re-theming of the arcade version was distributed as Pirate Pete in 1982.

Home versions of Jungle Hunt were published by Atari, Inc., sometimes under the Atarisoft label, for Apple II, Atari 2600, Atari 5200, Atari 8-bit family, ColecoVision, Commodore 64, VIC-20, and IBM PC compatibles.

Gameplay
The gameplay is split into four scenes, which have different objectives.

In Scene 1, the explorer is required to swing from vine to vine. This is accomplished by pressing the action key when two vines swing closely enough together. Timing is critical, and missing the vine causes the explorer to fall to the jungle floor, losing a life.

Scene 2 has the explorer navigating a crocodile-infested river. The explorer can attack the crocodiles from below with his knife, unless their mouths are open. The explorer must return to the surface periodically to breathe, where he cannot attack the crocodiles. Bubbles periodically rise from the bottom of the river, which can trap the explorer and carry him to the surface, potentially hitting crocodiles on the way.

Scene 3 involves the explorer dodging various-sized boulders rolling and bouncing towards him as he runs up the side of a volcano. Timing is critical as the differently sized boulders bounce at different speeds and heights, requiring the explorer to either jump or duck at the appropriate moment.

In the final scene, the explorer must evade cannibals while attempting to get to a woman being lowered into a flaming cauldron. After the player rescues the woman, the word "Congratulations!" appears, which is then followed by a message saying "I Love You!!!" followed by the woman kissing the explorer.

Further gameplay repeats the scenes with increased difficulty. On rounds other than the first, a cannibal appears in the tree of the cauldron scene and throws spears at the player.

Name change
The release of Jungle King with its Tarzan-like hero prompted legal action from the estate of Edgar Rice Burroughs. This resulted in the name being changed to Jungle Hunt with several cosmetic modifications:

The main character is an explorer wearing a pith helmet and safari outfit. 
The swinging vines have slightly different visuals to pass them off as ropes.
The Tarzan yell is replaced by the music from the end of the second scene.

Ports

Atari published home ports in 1983 under their own brand for the Atari 2600, Atari 5200, and Atari 8-bit family. Ports for other platforms were released under the Atarisoft label: Apple II, ColecoVision, Commodore 64, VIC-20, IBM PC compatibles, and TI-99/4A. In the Atari-ported versions the hero is named Sir Dudley, and the girl, married to Sir Dudley, is Lady Penelope.

The Apple II and IBM PC versions were developed by Sierra On-Line.

Reception
In the United States, Jungle King was the top-grossing upright arcade cabinet on the monthly RePlay charts by October 1982. Jungle Hunt had also topped the RePlay charts by January 1983. By July 1983, it had sold an estimated 18,000 arcade cabinets in the United States, and it was one of the six top-grossing games during that period. Jungle King went on to be one of the thirteen highest-grossing arcade games of 1983.

Bill Kunkel reviewed Jungle King for Electronic Games magazine in early 1983, writing that it could become Taito's "biggest hit since Space Invaders" as it follows "the classic formula for successful videogames: easy to learn, difficult to master." He said it was "an undeniable kick the first few plays, but doesn't seem to hold up for extended periods of time" and called the graphics of the vine-swinging segment "downright hideous" but noted that "gamers seem to be enjoying it."

Raymond Dimetrosky of Video Games Player rated the Atari VCS version a B+, calling it a "quite good" considering the limitations of the VCS. William Michael Brown reviewed the Atari 5200 port in the September 1983 issue of Electronic Fun with Computers & Games, rating it a 3 out of 4. He called it a significant improvement over the "disappointing" Atari VCS version, saying it looks and plays better and brings "much of the coin-op challenge."

Jungle Hunt received a Certificate of Merit in the category of "Best Adventure Videogame" at the 5th annual Arkie Awards in January 1984.

Legacy
In November 1982, Taito released another version of the game in arcades as Pirate Pete with the same gameplay. The player character is now a pirate; the vines are replaced by ropes swinging from the masts of a very long ship; sharks swim the water intead of crocodiles; and sword-wielding pirates take the place of cannibals.

In 1983, Milton Bradley published a board game version of Jungle Hunt where ropes are a key element.

Jungle Hunt is included in the Taito Legends collection for Microsoft Windows, PlayStation 2, and Xbox.

Notes

References

External links
Jungle Hunt at Arcade History
Jungle Hunt on Classic Game Room

1982 video games
Apple II games
Arcade video games
Atari 2600 games
Atari 5200 games
Atari 8-bit family games
ColecoVision games
Commodore 64 games
Multiplayer and single-player video games
Multiplayer hotseat games
Nintendo Switch games
PlayStation 4 games
Side-scrolling video games
Taito arcade games
Taito SJ System games
TI-99/4A games
VIC-20 games
Video games about pirates
Video games developed in Japan
Works based on Tarzan
Hamster Corporation games